Eunidia spilotoides is a species of beetle in the family Cerambycidae. It was described by Stephan von Breuning in 1939.

Subspecies
 Eunidia spilotoides snizekiana Téocchi, Jiroux & Sudre, 2004
 Eunidia spilotoides spilotoides Breuning, 1939

References

Eunidiini
Beetles described in 1939